A  tall statue of Bob Marley by Andy Edwards was installed on Jamaica Street in Liverpool, England, in September 2021. The artwork was commissioned by the Positive Vibration Festival of Reggae.

References

2021 establishments in England
2021 sculptures
Black people in art
Cultural depictions of Bob Marley
Monuments and memorials in England
Outdoor sculptures in England
Sculptures of men in the United Kingdom
Statues in England
Statues of musicians